Haymans Green is a 2008 album by The Pete Best Band, released by Lightyear Entertainment and distributed in the US and Canada by EMI. Pete Best plays drums, and co-wrote most of the tracks. Reviews of the album have been mostly favourable, and almost all reviewers agree that the album sounds influenced by The Beatles, a band which Pete Best was a member of between 1960 and 1962.

The album's cover shows the section of the Hamburg-era photograph of The Beatles featuring Best's face that was removed as part of the collage design for the Beatles' Anthology 1 album.

Track listing

Personnel
Pete Best – Drums
Roag Best – Drums, Percussion
Tony Flynn – Guitar, Vocals, Lead vocals on 4, 9
Phil Melia  – Guitar, Harmonica, Vocals, Lead vocal on 3
Paul Parry – Guitar, Piano, Keyboards, Vocals, Lead vocals on all tracks except 3, 4, 8
Engineers – Nic Johnston and Kenny Jones

References

Notes

2008 albums
Pete Best albums